A*P*E, released in South Korea as King Kong's Great Counterattack, is a 1976 monster film. An international co-production between South Korea and the United States, the film was produced by Kukje Movies and the Lee Ming Film Co. (South Korea) and Worldwide Entertainment (U.S.) with 3-D effects. Directed by Paul Leder and featuring special effects by Park Kwang Nam, the film stars Joanna Kerns, Rod Arrants and Alex Nicol. It marked an early film appearance by Kerns, who later moved to TV movies and series.

A*P*E was released at approximately the same time as Dino De Laurentiis' 1976 remake of King Kong. The film is generally regarded by some critics as a campy Z movie. In later years, the film has gone under the titles of Attack of the Giant Horny Gorilla (for its 1982 grindhouse re-release), and Hideous Mutant (for its original home video release).

Plot
A 36-foot-gorilla escapes from an oil tanker off the coast of South Korea. After battling with a giant great white shark, the ape reaches land. Shortly after, actress Marilyn Baker arrives in Korea to shoot a film, followed by her lover and journalist Tom. As the United States Military begins receiving reports of sightings of an unknown creature, the commanding officers initially dismiss them as nonsense. They rationalize the evidence, such as giant footprints, as being the work of the film production, joking someone should ask the creature if its name is "King Kong". The ape fights a giant python before a confrontation with archers, who attack but are unable to kill the massive primate. The U.S. military, consulting with Captain Kim of the South Korean Police, become convinced the reports are genuine. However, the officers cover up the truth from the media as Tom prods for answers.

Tom drops by the film set as Marilyn is filming a rape scene; he warns her after a cut that the ape is still at large and has killed people. Though she is skeptical of their relationship and his seriousness, they kiss. As the ape destroys entire villages, the military forcibly evacuates rural areas, and refugees flood the cities. The ape then emerges onto the filming location, where Marilyn, running as part of her performance, unwittingly lands into its paw. It carries her into the mountains, and the army gives Colonel Davis orders to capture the beast alive.

While the prehistoric creature battles helicopters, destroying a handful and giving the others the middle finger, Tom rescues Marilyn. The monster then enters Seoul, following Tom and Marilyn, and begins damaging buildings. After the creature kidnaps Marilyn again, tanks and increased firepower bring the beast down, and Tom and Marilyn are reunited.

Cast

Production

The movie was a quickie production meant to capitalize on the upcoming release of Dino DeLaurentis' King Kong. Several plot elements, such as a giant gorilla's relationship with an American actress, are essentially lifted from the King Kong story. In fact when the film was going into production in February 1976, it was announced as The New King Kong as it was advertised by a teaser poster in Boxoffice magazine. When RKO got wind of this, they filed a $1.5 million lawsuit against the company. Because of the lawsuit, the title was changed originally to Super Ape in June 1976, then to A*P*E on October 1, 1976, and the tagline "Not to be confused with King Kong" was added to the theatrical posters and movie trailer. However, the company was able to get away with using King Kong's name, not only in its native South Korea, but also in some international markets where it was known as Super King Kong and King Kong Returns respectively.

The film's special effect budget for the miniature buildings was only $1,200. The entire budget for A*P*E was $23,000. The film was shot in just 14 days.

The film's title A*P*E is jokingly explained as an abbreviation of "Attacking Primate monstEr", with the deliberate intention to spoof the acronym title of M*A*S*H, a popular 1970 film and subsequent 1972–1983 television series that was based in Korea where this film was produced.

The movie pitted the titular giant ape against a huge great white shark, meant to take a shot at Jaws, a movie about a giant shark made a year earlier. A famous cover of Famous Monsters of Filmland even addressed this scene.

The film hit North American screens in October 1976, merely two months before the release of King Kong.

Reception
Much of the commentary on A*P*E focuses on the film's low-quality special effects. For example, John Wilson, creator of the Razzies, claims that the ape suit used in the film "looks more like your grandmother's lamb's wool coat collar than an actual simian." He also remarks that "a five-year old could spot the [model buildings and vehicles] as phony." Wilson also describes the film's music as "one of the worst movie soundtracks of all time." Other critics have noted that the size of the ape appears to change throughout the film, and that the ape actor's T-shirt is visible through holes in his costume. At one point, the ape throws a snake at the camera and "the snake hits the camera, making it shake."

In a scathing review, monster movie critic Mike Bogue states that "A*P*E may not be the worst giant monster movie ever made, but it would have to chart high on any Top Ten Worst list." Citing such things as the ape vomiting and the ape dancing to the film score, Bogue states that "as the genre magazine Castle of Frankenstein used to say in its movie reviews, this one is so bad it has to be seen to be disbelieved."

In reviewing A*P*E, along with other King Kong parodies, Roy Morton states that the film "quickly degenerates into a dreadfully campy spoof." He speculates that on realizing the low quality of their production, the producers deliberately tried to make an already bad film worse in the hope that moviegoers would laugh with them, instead of at them. To that end, Morton states that while cinematically inferior to The Mighty Peking Man, A*P*E does have an "it's so bad it's good" cult film appeal the aforementioned film lacks. Nevertheless, he closes his review stating that the scene where the ape looks directly at the audience and gives everyone watching its movie "the finger" sums up the entire film.

References

External links

A*P*E at DVDCult.com
A*P*E at Americankaiju.com
 
 

1976 films
1970s monster movies
Giant monster films
South Korean science fiction horror films
1970s science fiction horror films
1976 horror films
American natural horror films
American science fiction horror films
1970s English-language films
Films about gorillas
1970s American films